Countess Caroline of Nassau-Saarbrücken (12 August 1704 – 25 March 1774) was Countess Palatine of Zweibrücken by marriage.

Biography 
She was the daughter of Count Louis Crato of Nassau-Saarbrücken (died 1713) and Countess Philippine Henriette of Hohenlohe (1679–1751).

On 21 September 1719, at the age of 15, she married her 44-year-old godfather, Christian III of Zweibrücken. The wedding took place at Castle Lorenzen in Nassau. This marriage produced four children:
 Caroline Henriette Christine (1721–1774), called "the great landgravine"
 married to Landgrave Louis IX of Hesse-Darmstadt
 Christian IV (1722–1775), Count Palatine and Duke of Palatinate-Zweibrücken
 Frederick Michael (1724–1767), Count Palatine of Birkenfeld
 Christiane Henriette (1725–1816), Countess Palatine of Zweibrücken-Birkenfeld and by marriage Princess of Waldeck-Pyrmont

When Christian III died in 1735, Caroline took over the Regency for five years, with the consent of Emperor Charles VI, until her son Christian IV came of age.

From 1744 to 1774 she lived at Bergzabern Castle. She died on 25 March 1774 in Darmstadt at the age of 69. Her grave is in the City Church in Darmstadt.

External links 
 Entry for Caroline, Princess of Nassau in GeneaNet

1704 births
1774 deaths
Countesses of Nassau
Countesses Palatine of Zweibrücken
18th-century women rulers
House of Nassau
Daughters of monarchs